Frida Richard (born Friederike Raithel, 1 November 1873 – 12 September 1946) was an Austrian actress.

Selected filmography

 The Sin of Helga Arndt (1916)
 The Queen's Love Letter (1916)
 The Marriage of Luise Rohrbach (1917)
 The Diamond Foundation (1917)
 The Ringwall Family (1918)
 Waves of Fate (1918)
 The Ghost Hunt (1918)
 The Pied Piper of Hamelin (1918)
 Intoxication (1919)
 Baccarat (1919)
 The Dancer (1919)
 Superstition (1919)
 The Teahouse of the Ten Lotus Flowers (1919)
 Temperamental Artist (1920)
 The Black Count (1920)
 Christian Wahnschaffe (1920)
 Judith Trachtenberg (1920)
 The Graveyard of the Living (1921)
 The Last Witness (1921)
 The Hunt for the Truth (1921)
 The New Paradise (1921)
 The Stranger from Alster Street (1921)
 About the Son (1921)
 Alfred von Ingelheim's Dramatic Life (1921)
 Wandering Souls (1921)
 The Shadow of Gaby Leed (1921)
 The Inheritance of Tordis (1921)
 The House on the Moon (1921)
 The Raft of the Dead (1921)
 A Dying Nation (1922)
 The Call of Destiny (1922)
 Prashna's Secret (1922)
 The Big Shot (1922)
 Phantom (1922)
 Barmaid (1922)
The Lost House (1922)
 Lola Montez, the King's Dancer (1922)
 The Treasure of Gesine Jacobsen (1923)
 The Lost Shoe (1923)
 Lyda Ssanin (1923)
 The Chain Clinks (1923)
 Daisy (1923)
 And Yet Luck Came (1923)
 The Men of Sybill (1923)
 Count Cohn (1923)
 The Flame (1923)
 Irene of Gold (1923)
 The Merchant of Venice (1923)
 New Year's Eve (Sylvester: Tragödie einer Nacht) (1924)
 Siegfried (1924)
 Spring Awakening (1924)
 Leap Into Life (1924)
 By Order of Pompadour (1924)
 The Stolen Professor (1924)
 Heart of Stone (1924)
 Claire (1924)
 Playing with Destiny (1924)
 Mountain of Destiny (1924)
  The Hanseatics (1925)
 The Old Ballroom (1925)
 The Island of Dreams (1925)
 Old Mamsell's Secret (1925)
 The Elegant Bunch (1925)
  Den of Iniquity (1925)
 Oh Those Glorious Old Student Days (1925)
 An Artist of Life (1925)
 The Dice Game of Life (1925)
 Shadows of the Metropolis (1925)
 The Flower Girl of Potsdam Square (1925)
 Slums of Berlin (1925)
 Lightning (1925)
 The Telephone Operator (1925)
 The Woman Who Did (1925)
 The Farmer from Texas (1925)
 Peter the Pirate (1925)
 Hedda Gabler (1925)
 Elegantes Pack (1925)
 Cock of the Roost (1925)
 Give My Regards to the Blonde Child on the Rhine (1926)
 The Blue Danube (1926)
 False Shame (1926)
 Maytime (1926)
 Women of Passion (1926)
 Fedora (1926)
 Vienna, How it Cries and Laughs (1926)
 The Circus of Life (1926)
 Watch on the Rhine (1926)
 Should We Be Silent? (1926)
 The Brothers Schellenberg (1926)
 The Young Man from the Ragtrade (1926)
 Faust (1926)
 The Holy Mountain (1926)
 The Convicted (1927)
 Intoxicated Love (1927)
 The Most Beautiful Legs of Berlin (1927)
 Light-Hearted Isabel (1927)
 On the Banks of the River Weser (1927)
 Chance the Idol (1927)
 The Curse of Vererbung (1927)
 Weekend Magic (1927)
 Tragedy of a Marriage (1927)
 The Eighteen Year Old (1927)
 The Girl from Abroad (1927)
 Carnival Magic (1927)
 Grand Hotel (1927)
 That Was Heidelberg on Summer Nights (1927)
 The Queen Was in the Parlour (1927)
 The Prince of Rogues (1928)
  Lemke's Widow (1928)
 Katharina Knie (1929)
 The Convict from Istanbul (1929)
 The Burning Heart (1929)
 The Woman One Longs For (1929)
 Love in the Ring (1930)
 The Man Who Murdered (1931)
 The Victor (1932)
 Voices of Spring (1933)
 Unfinished Symphony (1934)
 When You're Young, the World Belongs to You (1934)
 Suburban Cabaret (1935)
 His Daughter is Called Peter (1936)
 The Priest from Kirchfeld (1937)
 Mirror of Life (1938)
 A Mother's Love (1939)
 A Hopeless Case (1939)
 Goodbye, Franziska (1941)
 Rembrandt (1942)
 Die goldene Stadt (1942)
 Opfergang (1944)

Bibliography
 Kester, Bernadette. Film Front Weimar: Representations of the First World War in German films of the Weimar Period (1919-1933)''. Amsterdam University Press, 2003.

External links

1873 births
1946 deaths
Austrian film actresses
Austrian silent film actresses
Actresses from Vienna
20th-century Austrian actresses
Actresses from the Austro-Hungarian Empire